Vipava can refer to:

 Vipava, Vipava, town in southwestern Slovenia
 Vipava (river), in Slovenia and Italy
 Vipava Valley, valley of the Vipava in southwestern Slovenia